Peterborough & Fletton United F.C. was an English football club based in Peterborough, Cambridgeshire. The club existed until 1932 and played at London Road.

History
The club was originally established as Fletton United in 1901. They were founder members of the Peterborough & District League in 1902 and were its inaugural champions, remaining unbeaten in the league's first season. After retaining the league title in both of the next two seasons, the club left the league and joined Division One of the Northamptonshire League. They finished bottom of the league in 1913–14, but were runners-up in 1921–22.

After finishing third in 1922–23, the club were voted into the Eastern Section of the Southern League, at which point they adopted the name Peterborough & Fletton United in an attempt to gain the backing of tradesmen and people of Peterborough, and give other Southern League clubs an idea of their geographical location. In their first season in the league they won the Eastern Section, and went on to beat Yeovil 3–1 in the championship play-off. In 1927–28 they reached the third round of the FA Cup, where they lost 4–3 to Birmingham. At the end of the season they applied for the elections to Division Three South of the Football League, but received only two votes.

After finishing eighth out of ten clubs in 1931–32 the club left the Southern League, and subsequently folded after being suspended by the Football Association. A new club, Peterborough United, was formed as a replacement in 1934.

Honours
Peterborough & District League
Champions 1902–03, 1903–04, 1904–05

See also
Peterborough & Fletton United F.C. players

References

Sport in Peterborough
Defunct football clubs in England
Peterborough and District Football League
United Counties League
Southern Football League clubs
Association football clubs disestablished in 1932
1932 disestablishments in England
Defunct football clubs in Cambridgeshire
Association football clubs established in 1901